Symbolophorus kreffti is a species of fish in the family Myctophidae.

Etymology
The fish is named in honor of Gerhard Krefft (1912-1993) of the Institut für Seefischerei  in Hamburg, he being the first to recognize the specimens of Symbolophorus from near the Cape Verde Islands might be specifically distinct from another species Symbolophorus  veranyi.

References 

Myctophidae
Taxa named by P. Alexander Hulley
Animals described in 1981